Homaloxestis pancrocopa is a moth in the family Lecithoceridae. It was described by Edward Meyrick in 1937. It is found in the former Katanga Province of the Democratic Republic of the Congo.

References

Moths described in 1937
Homaloxestis